These are the results of the men's C-1 slalom competition in canoeing at the 1992 Summer Olympics. The C-1 (canoe single) event is raced by one-man canoes through a whitewater course. The venue for the 1992 Olympic competition was in La Seu d'Urgell.

Medalists

Results
The 31 competitors each took two runs through the whitewater slalom course on August 1. The best time of the two runs counted for the event.

References

1992 Summer Olympics official report Volume 5.  pp. 150–1. 
1992 men's C-1 results
Wallechinsky, David and Jaime Loucky (2008). "Canoeing: Men's Canadian Slalom Singles". In The Complete Book of the Olympics: 2008 Edition. London: Aurum Press Limited. p. 486.

Men's Slalom C-1
Men's events at the 1992 Summer Olympics